, Op. 6, is an orchestral composition by Jean Sibelius, composed in 1904 for the programme that introduced his Violin Concerto. Its title refers to the cassation, a genre similar to the serenade, which was popular in the late 18th century. Sibelius structured the work in five "episodes". Although his opus numbers were already in the forties, he assigned the unused number Op. 6 to this work, implying an earlier composition date.

Performance 
 was first performed in Helsinki on 8 February 1904 by the Orchestra of Helsinki Philharmonic Society, conducted by the composer. Another substantial work also introduced in that concert was Tulen synty (The Origin of Fire), Op. 32, while a review by Oskar Merikanto evaluated  as "fairly insignificant". Sibelius revised the work in 1905, but left a note "Bör omarbetas" (Must be revised).

Reviews 
The beginning of the music, in a chromatic "suspense-filling way", has been compared to the similar opening of Monty Norman's Dr No, the first James Bond film from 1962. Rob Barnett notes in a review of a recording by the Lahti Symphony Orchestra, conducted by Osmo Vänskä as part of a complete recording of the composer's works: "Sibelius must have had a sense of humour to call this work a 'cassation'". He describes it as a ballade for orchestra, beginning: "stern, relentlessly insistent, ferocious and triple forte". He points out a "Balakirev-style clarinet solo", an "Elgarian serenade", and a "chaste oboe solo", concluding: "The piece is played and recorded with wit, rapacious energy and gripping concentration."

Literature 
 Tomi Mäkelä: "Jean Sibelius und seine Zeit" (German), Laaber-Verlag, Laaber 2013

References 

Compositions for symphony orchestra
Compositions by Jean Sibelius
1904 compositions